Eugenio Alafaci (born 9 August 1990) is an Italian former professional racing cyclist, who rode professionally between 2014 and 2019 for the  and  teams.

Major results

2008
 5th Road race, UCI Juniors World Championships
 UEC European Junior Road Championships
9th Time trial
10th Road race
2010
 5th Trofeo Città di Brescia
2011
 7th Gran Premio della Liberazione
 8th Circuito del Porto
2012
 1st  Points classification Tour du Loir-et-Cher
 2nd Antwerpse Havenpijl
 4th Overall Le Triptyque des Monts et Châteaux
 4th Gooikse Pijl
 9th De Vlaamse Pijl
2013
 1st Omloop der Kempen
 3rd Grand Prix Criquielion
 4th Overall Flèche du Sud
1st  Points classification
 5th Overall Le Triptyque des Monts et Châteaux
 6th Ronde van Midden-Nederland
 9th Coppa Bernocchi

Grand Tour general classification results timeline

References

External links
 

1990 births
Living people
Italian male cyclists
Cyclists from the Province of Varese
21st-century Italian people